William Farrington Kitchin (28 July 1882 – death unknown) was an English professional rugby league footballer who played in the 1900s and 1910s.

Background
William Kitchin was born in Whitehaven, Cumberland, England.

Playing career

International honours
William Kitchin won caps for England while at Huddersfield in 1911 against Wales, and Australia.

Career records
William Kitchin was the league's top try-scorer in the 1910–11 season with 41-tries.

Genealogical information
William Kitchin's marriage was registered during first ¼ 1907 in Huddersfield district.

Notes

References

1882 births
England national rugby league team players
English rugby league players
Huddersfield Giants players
Place of death missing
Rugby league wingers
Rugby league players from Whitehaven
Year of death missing